The women's marathon at the 2022 European Athletics Championships took place at the streets of Munich on 15 August.

Records

Schedule

Results
The race was started on 10:30.

References

Marathon W
Marathons at the European Athletics Championships
Euro
Marathons in Germany
2022 marathons